The COVID-19 pandemic in Benin is part of the ongoing worldwide pandemic of coronavirus disease 2019 caused by severe acute respiratory syndrome coronavirus 2. The virus was confirmed to have reached Benin in March 2020.

Background
On 12 January 2020, the World Health Organization (WHO) confirmed that a novel coronavirus was the cause of a respiratory illness in a cluster of people in Wuhan City, Hubei Province, China, which was reported to the WHO on 31 December 2019.

The case fatality ratio for COVID-19 has been much lower than SARS of 2003, but the transmission has been significantly greater, with a significant total death toll. Model-based simulations for Benin suggest that the 95% confidence interval for the time-varying reproduction number R t diminished to around 0.6 during the second half of 2021.

Timeline

March to June 2020 
 On 16 March, the first COVID-19 case in the country was confirmed in Porto-Novo, the capital of Benin. Three days later, the second confirmed case was reported. The city has suspended various international flights and people coming into the country via air are being kept under 14 days' mandatory isolation. Moreover, people in Benin are advised to wear masks and go outside home only if required.
 There were 9 confirmed cases and one recovery in March, leaving 8 active cases at the end of the month.
 In April there were 55 new cases, bringing the total number of confirmed cases to 64. The first death from COVID-19 occurred on 5 April. The number of recovered patients increased to 33, leaving 30 active cases at the end of the month.
 There were 168 new cases in May, bringing the total number of confirmed cases to 232. The death toll grew to 3. There were 110 recoveries during the month, raising the number of recovered patients to 143, leaving 86 active cases at the end of the month.
 In June there were 967 new cases, bringing the total number of confirmed cases to 1199. The death toll rose to 21. There were 190 recoveries during the month, bringing the number of recovered patients to 333, leaving 845 active cases at the end of the month.

July to December 2020 
 There were 606 new cases in July, 340 in August, 212 in September, 286 in October, 372 in November, and 236 in December. The total number of cases stood at 1805 in July, 2145 in August, 2357 in September, 2643 in October, 3015 in November, and 3251 in December.
 The number of recovered patients increased to 1036 in July, 1973 in September, 2418 in October, 2839 in November, and 3061 in December, leaving 733 active cases at the end of July, 367 at the end of August, 343 at the end of September, 184 at the end of October, 133 at the end of November, and 146 at the end of December.
 The death toll rose to 36 in July, 40 in August, 41 in September, 43 in November, and 44 in December.

January to December 2021 
 The national vaccination campaign began on 29 March, initially with 144,000 doses of the Covishield vaccine.
 There were 642 new cases in January, 1541 in February, 1666 in March, 721 in April, 237 in May, 141 in June, 195 in July, 4972 in August, 10524 in September, 859 in October, 114 in November, and 72 in December. The total number of cases stood at 3,893 in January, 5,434 in February, 7,100 in March, 7,821 in April, 8,058 in May, 8,199 in June, 8,394 in July, 13,366 in August, 23,890 in September, 24,749 in October, 24,863 in November, and 24,935 in December.
 The number of recovered patients increased to 3,421 in January, 4,248 in February, 6,452 in March, 7,580 in April, 7,893 in May, 8,000 in June, 8,136 in July, 8,854 in August, 21,993 in September, 24,346 in October, 24,554 in November, and 24,736 in December, leaving 420 active cases at the end of January, 1116 at the end of February, 558 at the end of March, 142 at the end of April, 64 at the end of May, 95 at the end of June, 150 at the end of July, 4384 at the end of August, 1738 at the end of September, 242 at the end of October, 148 at the end of November, and 38 at the end of December.
 The death toll rose to 52 in January, 70 in February, 90 in March, 99 in April, 101 in May, 104 in June, 108 in July, 128 in August, 159 in September, and 161 in October.
 Modeling carried out by WHO’s Regional Office for Africa suggests that due to under-reporting, the true cumulative number of infections by the end of 2021 was around 5.4 million while the true number of COVID-19 deaths was around 1470.

January to December 2022 
 There were 1515 new cases in January, 125 in February, 377 in March, 264 in June, 100 in July, 174 in August, 148 in September, 144 in October, 198 in November, and 2 in December. The total number of cases stood at 26,450 in January, 26,575 in February, 26,952 in March, 27,216 in June, 27,316 in July, 27,490 in August, 27,638 in September, 27,782 in October, 27,980 in November, and 27,982 in December.
 The number of recovered patients increased to 25,931 in January, 26,353 in February, and 27,817 in December, leaving 356 active cases at the end of January, 59 at the end of February, and 2 at the end of December.
 The death toll rose to 163 in January.

January to December 2023 
 There were 7 new cases in January. The total number of cases was 27,989 in January.
 The number of recovered patients increase to 27,823 in January, leaving 3 active cases at the end of the month.

Statistics

Confirmed new cases

Confirmed deaths

Vaccination 

COVID-19 vaccination in Benin is an ongoing immunization campaign against severe acute respiratory syndrome coronavirus 2 (SARS-CoV-2), the virus that causes coronavirus disease 2019 (COVID-19), in response to the ongoing pandemic in the country.  As of 28 June 2021, Benin has administered 36,188 doses, 26,268 people with one dose and 9,920 people fully vaccinated.

Vaccines on order

Timeline

March 2021 
 On 11 March 2021, Benin received 144,000 doses of the AstraZeneca vaccine.
 On 22 March 2021, Benin received 203,000 doses of the Sinovac vaccine.
 On 29 March 2021, Benin launched its coronavirus vaccination campaign.

April to June 2021 
 By the end of April, 10,051 vaccine doses had been administered.
 By the end of May, 12,934 vaccine doses had been administered.
 By the end of June, 46,108 vaccine doses had been administered.

July to September 2021 

 Benin received 302,400 doses of the Janssen COVID-19 vaccine on 27 July. By the end of the month 61,858 vaccine doses had been administered.
 By the end of August, 120,333 vaccine doses had been administered.
 By the end of September, 214,396 vaccine doses had been administered.

October to December 2021 
 By the end of October, 277,614 vaccine doses had been administered while 4% of the targeted population had been fully vaccinated.
 By the end of November, 383,501 vaccine doses had been administered while 6% of the targeted population had been fully vaccinated.
 By the end of December, 1.8 million vaccine doses had been administered while 26% of the targeted population had been fully vaccinated.

January to March 2022 
 By the end of January, 2.1 million vaccine doses had been administered while 33% of the targeted population had been fully vaccinated.
 By the end of February, 2.8 million vaccine doses had been administered while more than two million persons had been fully vaccinated.
 By the end of March, 3.3 million vaccine doses had been administered while 2.4 million persons had been fully vaccinated.

See also 
 COVID-19 pandemic in Africa
 COVID-19 pandemic by country and territory

References

External links 
 Africa Centres for Disease Control and Prevention (CDC) Dashboard on Covid-19 
 COVID-19 Africa Open Data Project Dashboard
 West African Health Organization COVID-19 Dashboard
 WHO COVID-19 Dashboard

 
COVID-19 pandemic
COVID-19 pandemic
Benin
Vaccination campaign
Benin
Benin
Disease outbreaks in Benin
COVID-19 pandemic
COVID-19 pandemic